Benedetta Tagliabue (born 24 June 1963) is an Italian architect. She lives and works in Barcelona, Spain.

Education
Tagliabue was born in Milan, Italy.  In 1989, she graduated in Venice from the "Università Iuav di Venezia" in Italy.

Presently, Benedetta Tagliabue teaches at the University of Architecture ETSAB (Escola Tècnica Superior d'Arquitectura de Barcelona) in Barcelona and lectures regularly in architectural forums. In 2004, Tagliabue received an Honorary Doctor of Arts degree from Napier University and she is a member of The Royal Incorporation of Architects in Scotland.

EMBT career
Tagliabue began her collaboration with Enric Miralles, with whom she founded the studio Miralles Tagliabue EMBT. Together their work includes iconic buildings and public spaces in Barcelona such as the Gas Natural tower, Santa Caterina market, and Diagonal Mar park. Buildings in other European cities include the Scottish Parliament in Edinburgh, Utrecht’s town council, and a music school in Hamburg. Under Tagliabue’s direction, the studio currently works not only within scope of architecture, but also within that of landscape, public space, building restoration, temporary installations, and design.

Work (selected)

 1998 to 1999 House at La Clota, Barcelona, Catalonia, Spain.
 1996 to 2000 Six houses, Amsterdam, Netherlands
 1997 to 2000 Utrecht City Hall extension, Netherlands
 1998 to 2000 Extension of the Music School Hamburg

 1999 to 2000 Set design for the opera "Don Quijote", Liceu Theatre, Barcelona, 
 1999 to 2001 Parc dels Colors, Mollet del Vallès, Barcelona (province)
 1997 to 2002 Parc de Diagonal Mar, Barcelona
 1999 to 2003 University Campus at Vigo, Galicia, Spain
 1998 to 2004 Scottish Parliament Building in Edinburgh, Scotland
 1997 to 2005 Santa Caterina Market rehabilitation, Barcelona 
 2002 to 2005 Hafencity Hamburg, Magellan-Terrassen, Germany
 2006	       Arcelor Pavilion for exhibitions, Esch-sur-Alzette, Luxembourg
 2006         Principal Building University Campus at Vigo
 2001 to 2007 Social Housing in Figueres, Catalonia, Spain
 1997 to 2007 Public Library at Palafolls, Barcelona, Catalonia, Spain
 1999 to 2007 Torre Mare Nostrum, new headquarters of Gas Natural, Barcelona
 1999 to 2007 Acoustic Panels for Gran Via traffic way renovation in Barcelona
 2002 to 2007 Hafencity Hamburg Public Space, Marco Polo Platz, Germany
 2008 to 2009 Scenery for Merce Cunningham Dance Company

Awards
EMBT’s architecture, attentively aware of context, has earned them multiple international awards: 
RIBA Charles Jencks Award in 2013
Prize Ciutat de Barcelona in 2009, Category International projection The Spanish Pavilion Exhibition Shanghai 2010
RIBA Stirling Best Building Award in 2001 for The Scottish Parliament
Rietveld Prize in 2001 for the Utrecht town Council, The Netherlands
Premi Nacional de Catalunya in 2001, for Santa Caterina Market in Barcelona
BDA Hamburg Architektur Preis in 2002 for the Music School of Hamburg
Premio FAD de Arquitectura in 2004 for the University Campus in Vigo
Honour Award of the American Society of Landscape Architects in 2005 for the Diagonal Mar Park in Barcelona
Premio de la Bienal de Arquitectura Española in 2005 for the Scottish Parliament in Edinburgh.
Prize Leone d'Oro at the Biennale di Venezia in 2006 for the Pavilion dedicated to the Sports Hall of Huesca, Aragon, (Spain) for the Biennal of Venice 1996, VI International Exhibition of Architecture. "Sensori del Futuro: l'Architetto come Sismografo". Director Hans Hollein.

Publications
2009 EL CROQUIS, N. 144. EMBT 2000 2009 ENRIC MIRALLES BENEDETTA TAGLIABUE After-life in progress.
2008 AA. Arquitecturas de Author 2006. EMBT Miralles-Tagliabue.  (Edición T6 Ediciones 2006, Escuela Técnica Superior de Arquitectura. Universidad de Navarra, Pamplona, Navarre, Spain).
2007 Benedetta Tagliabue “EATING THE CITY”  Workshop Printemps 2007. ESA Productions (École  Spéciale d’Architecture Paris).
2006 ACTAR, Catalan College of Architects, Ministry of Housing, Barcelona City Hall,  Works in Progress, revised and extended edition
2004 Architecture drawn. The project of Miralles Tagliabue for Diagonal Mar. (Salvat + EMBT MirallesTagliabue, Barcelona, España 2004)
2003 Loft / teNeues, Miralles Tagliabue EMBT Arquitectes
2000 El Croquis N.100 101, Enric Miralles Benedetta Tagliabue 1996–2000
1999 GG. Miralles Tagliabue time architecture. Architecture Monograph, Editorial Gustavo Gili
1995 Mixed Talks, a book about the latest projects of the Miralles Office was published by Academy Editions.
1996 Monographic issue of their work KA Korean Architects. Edited Enric Miralles: opere e Progetti, published by Electa

External links
 Interview with architect Benedetta Tagliabue of EMBT

References

MEAMnet biography
Miralles Tagliabue EMBT bio

1963 births
Architects from Milan
Living people
Italian women architects
Academic staff of the Polytechnic University of Catalonia